Levi Najara was a Spanish rabbi who emigrated in 1492 to Mamluk Palestine, probably to Safed. He was the father of Moses Najara I.

References

15th-century rabbis from the Mamluk Sultanate
Jews expelled from Spain in 1492
Rabbis in Safed
Sephardi rabbis in Ottoman Palestine
Sephardi Jews in the Mamluk Sultanate
Spanish rabbis
Year of birth unknown
Year of death unknown